Amar Pal Singh (31 May 1946, Village Dhikouli, Meerut district, (Uttar Pradesh)) is a leader of Bharatiya Janata Party from Uttar Pradesh. He served as member of the Lok Sabha representing Meerut (Lok Sabha constituency). He was elected to 10th, 11th and 12th Lok Sabha.

Source -

References

India MPs 1991–1996
People from Meerut district
1946 births
Living people
Bharatiya Janata Party politicians from Uttar Pradesh
India MPs 1996–1997
India MPs 1998–1999
Lok Sabha members from Uttar Pradesh
Uttar Pradesh MLAs 1989–1991